The 2012 United States Senate election in Mississippi was held on November 6, 2012, alongside the 2012 U.S. presidential election, other elections to the United States Senate in other states, as well as elections to the United States House of Representatives and various state and local elections. Incumbent Republican U.S. Senator Roger Wicker won re-election to his first full term, while Albert N. Gore (possibly distant related to former U.S. Vice President Al Gore) was the Democratic nominee.

Background 
Former U.S. representative Roger Wicker was appointed by Governor Haley Barbour after then-incumbent Trent Lott retired at the end of 2007. A 2008 special election was later scheduled to determine who would serve the remainder of the term. Then-U.S. Sen. Roger Wicker defeated former Mississippi Governor Ronnie Musgrove with 54.96% of the vote in the special election and will be up for re-election in 2012.

Republican primary

Candidates 
 E. Allen Hathcock, Tea Party activist and Army veteran
 Robert Maloney
 Roger Wicker, incumbent U.S. Senator

Results

Democratic primary

Candidates 
 Albert N. Gore, Jr. chairman of the Oktibbeha County Democratic Party
 Will Oatis, Afghan War veteran and Independent candidate for governor in 2011 before dropping out
 Roger Weiner, member of the Coahoma County Board of Supervisors

Results

General election

Candidates 
 Roger Wicker (R), incumbent U.S. Senator
 Albert Gore (D), chairman of the Oktibbeha County Democratic Party
 Thomas Cramer (Constitution), employee of Ingalls Shipbuilding
 Shawn O'Hara (Reform), former chairman of the Reform Party of the United States of America and perennial candidate

Predictions

Results

See also 
 2012 United States Senate elections
 2012 United States House of Representatives elections in Mississippi

References

External links 
 Elections Division from the Mississippi secretary of state
 Campaign contributions at OpenSecrets.org
 Outside spending at the Sunlight Foundation
 Candidate issue positions at On the Issues
 League of Women Voters on Albert N. Gore Jr.

Official campaign websites (Archived)
 Roger Wicker for U.S. Senate
 Thomas Cramer for U.S. Senate

2012
Mississippi
United States Senate